The Andaman bulbul (Brachypodius fuscoflavescens) is a member of the bulbul family of passerine birds. It is endemic to the Andaman Islands. It has a mainly olive-yellow plumage and has most of the head olive. It feeds on small fruit and berries, but will also take insects.

Until 2008, the Andaman bulbul was considered as a subspecies of the black-headed bulbul.

References

Rasmussen, P.C., and J.C. Anderton (2005). Birds of South Asia. The Ripley Guide. Volume 2: Attributes and Status. Smithsonian Institution and Lynx Edicions, Washington D.C. and Barcelona.

Andaman bulbul
Birds of the Andaman Islands
Endemic fauna of the Andaman Islands
Andaman bulbul